Nanjangud Shivananju Manju (born 9 May 1987) is an Indian professional footballer who played as a defender for Bengaluru FC in the I-League. He was capped 25 times for India. He is currently working as a Football Commentator in Star Sports 1 Kannada Channel for the Indian Super League.

Career

Early career
In his early career, Manju played for Hindustan Aeronautics Limited S.C., Mahindra United, and Mohun Bagan A.C. all in the National Football League and I-League. Manju was nominated for the ‘Best Indian Player’ Award at the inaugural edition of the FPAI Awards Night in 2009.

United Sikkim
On 18 February 2011, it was announced that Manju had signed with United Sikkim F.C. of the I-League 2nd Division along with national team teammate Renedy Singh. The major decider in him going was the fact that the team was owned by his national teammate Baichung Bhutia.

Pune FC (loan)
On 7 January 2012, it was confirmed that Manju had signed for I-League side Pune F.C. on loan for the remainder of the 2011–12 I-League season.

Bengaluru FC
After not playing at all during the 2012–13 I-League season, Manju signed for new direct-entry I-League club Bengaluru FC for the 2013–14 season. He made his debut for the club on 2 November 2013 against Mumbai F.C. at the Balewadi Sports Complex in which he played the full match as Bengaluru FC drew the match 2–2.

International
After doing well in domestic league football, Manju earned a call-up to the India national football team. Before playing for the seniors, Manju was captain of the India U23 team. He was on the India national squad who won the prestigious Nehru Cup in 2007 and 2009.

He was on the squad that toured Barcelona as a preparatory camp for the Nehru Cup 2009, but unfortunately got himself injured in the first match of the Nehru Cup 2009 vs Lebanon which ruled him out of the Nehru Cup 2009, IFA Shield, Durand Cup as well as Federation Cup.

International goals
Scores and results list India's goal tally first.

Honours

India
 SAFF Championship: 2005; runner-up: 2008
 Nehru Cup: 2007, 2009

References

1984 births
Living people
Indian footballers
Sportspeople from Mysore
2011 AFC Asian Cup players
I-League players
I-League 2nd Division players
India international footballers
India youth international footballers
Hindustan Aeronautics Limited S.C. players
Mahindra United FC players
United Sikkim F.C. players
Mohun Bagan AC players
Pune FC players
Bengaluru FC players
Footballers at the 2006 Asian Games
Footballers from Karnataka
Association football defenders
Asian Games competitors for India
South Asian Games silver medalists for India
South Asian Games medalists in football